The multipored rock gecko or Woodbush flat gecko (Afroedura multiporis) is a species of African gecko found in South Africa.

Distribution
A. multiporis is endemic to Limpopo, South Africa.

Habitat
A. multiporis is found within granite and quartzite cliffs at elevations of 1,400-1,800 meters. This species prefers the vegetation types of the Mamabolo Mountain Bushveld, Woodbush Granite Grasslands, and the Poung Dolomite Mountain Bushveld.

Conservation Status
As of 2022 The IUCN lists A. multiporis as Near Threatened. The IUCN also states that the largest concurrent threat to A. multiporis is heavy afforestation that fragments and reduces the range the species inhabits. The construction of Ebenezer Dam in 1959 also severely disrupted the available habitat, although is unlikely to cause further reduction in available habitat. 

Much of A. multiporis' remaining Extent of Occurrence (646km²) lies within protected land. However, the unprotected land is subject to extensive land transformation.

References

multiporis
Endemic reptiles of South Africa
Taxa named by John Hewitt (herpetologist)
Reptiles described in 1925
Fauna of South Africa
Endemic fauna of South Africa